Andrea Matteo Palmieri (1493–1537) was an Italian Roman Catholic bishop and cardinal.

Biography

Andrea Matteo Palmieri was born in Naples on August 10, 1493. He was a cleric in Naples before being elected Archbishop of Averenza and Matera on July 30, 1518, with dispensation for not yet having reached the canonical age of 27.

During the pontificate of Pope Adrian VI, he spent his own money and solicited funds from his friends in the Knights Hospitaller to prepare troops to fight against the Ottoman Empire. However, after the fall of Rhodes (1522), this plan had to be abandoned.

Pope Clement VII made him a cardinal priest in the consistory of November 21, 1527.  He received the red hat and the titular church of San Clemente at that time.

On August 21, 1528, he resigned the administration of Averenza and Matera in favor of his brother Francesco Palmieri. He was the administrator of the see of Sarno from May 24, 1529 until August 24, 1530. From January 9, 1534 to January 8, 1535, he was Camerlengo of the Sacred College of Cardinals. He was administrator of the see of Lucera August 20, 1534 until February 26, 1535.

He participated in the papal conclave of 1534 that elected Pope Paul III.

From June 15, 1535 until July 16, 1535, he was administrator of the see of Conza. He was administrator of the see of Policastro from July 5, 1535 until his death. Shortly before the cardinal's death, Charles V, Holy Roman Emperor named him governor of Milan.

He died in Rome on January 20, 1537. He is buried in Santa Maria del Popolo.

References

1493 births
1537 deaths
16th-century Italian cardinals
15th-century Neapolitan people
Archbishops of Sant'Angelo dei Lombardi-Conza-Nusco-Bisaccia
16th-century Neapolitan people